Love Letters is a 1999 American made-for-television drama film directed by Stanley Donen and based on the 1988 play by A. R. Gurney. Gurney adapted his own original play, dramatizing scenes and portraying characters that were merely described in the play. Donen had envisioned it to be a feature film, but a limited budget restricted him to make a TV movie and he shot the film in only 17 days. It was his last film before his death in 2019. Love Letters originally premiered on ABC on April 12, 1999.

Plot
An ambitious U.S. Senator reflects back on his life after the death of a woman whom he loved and kept in contact with only through correspondence. The movie is told in flashbacks as the two first meet as children and begin their lifelong correspondence. He grows into his political aspirations and leaves her behind, as she becomes a struggling artist facing a rocky life: the two encounter different experiences on the paths they take.

Cast 
 Steven Weber as Andrew Ladd  
 Laura Linney as Melissa Gardner Cobb  
 Kirsten Storms as Teenaged Melissa  
 Tim Redwine as Teenaged Andrew  
 Isabella Fink as Melissa - Age 7  
 Stephen Joffe as Andy - Age 7  
 Chas Lawther as Harry

References

External links 
 

1999 television films
1999 films
1999 drama films
American films based on plays
Films directed by Stanley Donen
Films scored by Lee Holdridge
American drama television films
1990s English-language films
1990s American films